The Lely Mountains (Dutch: Lelygebergte, Ndyuka: Ando Busiman Mongo) are a mountain plateau on the left bank of the Tapanahony and Marowijne rivers in Suriname. In 2005, 25 new species were discovered in the Lely Mountains.

The mountain range is served by the Lelygebergte Airstrip.

Name 
The mountain range is named after Cornelis Lely, a former governor of Suriname. The Ndyuka maroons call the mountains the Ando Busiman Mongo after the famed Ndyuka explorer Ando Busiman.

References

Notes

Bibliography 

Mountain ranges of Suriname